Ustinov is a surname of Russian origin. The feminine form is Ustinova. People with this name include:

 Alexander Ustinov (born 1976), K-1 fighter and boxer
 Dmitriy Ustinov (1908–1984), the Soviet Union's defence minister from 1976 to 1984
 Ivan Ustinov (1920–2020), Soviet military counterintelligence officer
 Jona von Ustinov aka "Klop" Ustinov (1892–1962), journalist and diplomat, father of Sir Peter Ustinov
 Sir Peter Ustinov (1921–2004), born Peter Alexander von Ustinov, British actor, writer, dramatist and raconteur.
 Plato von Ustinov (1840–1918), Russian aristocrat who lived in Jaffa, father of Jonah von Ustinov
 Vladimir Ustinov (born 1953), Russian politician

See also
 Ustinov College, University of Durham, England
 Izhevsk, renamed in Dimitri Ustinov's honour in 1985, but was reverted to Izhevsk two years later.
 Russian cruiser Marshal Ustinov, named after Dmitriy Ustinov.

Russian-language surnames